Peter Thomas Nardone BA FRCO (born 1965) is primarily a freelance conductor, singer and composer. He has sung with the Monteverdi Choir, The King’s Consort and the Tallis Scholars. He has been Director of Music at Chelmsford Cathedral and was subsequently Organist and Director of Music at Worcester Cathedral.

Early life and education 
Nardone was born in Elderslie, Scotland. He was educated at John Neilson High School, Paisley, before going on to study organ and piano at Royal Scottish Academy of Music and Drama (1983-1986).  As a boy he sang in the choir of Paisley Abbey, where he continued as a countertenor until 1986.  In 1986 was awarded a grant by the Countess of Munster Musical Trust to study singing at Royal Academy of Music, London.

He gained the FRCO diploma in 1999.

Career

Organist & Conductor 
In 1986 Nardone was appointed Assistant Organist at Croydon Parish Church, and in 1988 was made Assistant Organist at the Chapel Royal of St. Peter ad Vincula with HM Tower of London.  In 1993 he was appointed Organist of Croydon Parish Church and in 2000 left to become Director of Music at Chelmsford Cathedral and Artistic Director of Chelmsford Cathedral Festival (2000-2007).  In 2012 he became Organist and Director of Music at Worcester Cathedral and Artistic Director of Three Choirs Festival.  As a conductor he has worked with The King’s Consort and the Philharmonia.  He was also conductor of the Worcester Festival Choral Society.

Singer 
From 1987 till 1995 Nardone sang with Monteverdi Choir and between 1987 and 2011 was a frequent singer with Tallis Scholars, The King’s Consort, The Taverner Consort and Players, the choir of The English Concert, the choir of The Orchestra of the Age of Enlightenment, The London Classical Players, The Gabrieli Consort, The Scottish Early Music Consort, Capella Nova and The Ensemble Gilles Binchois.  From 1987 till 1994 he was the singing tutor at Harrow School.

Awards and honours 
1999 Fellow of the Royal College of Organists
 2000 Associate of the Royal Academy of Music
 2008 Honorary Fellowship of the Guild of Church Musicians
 2010 Honorary Doctor of Arts Anglia Ruskin University

Works

Published by Boosey & Hawkes 

 Jubilate Deo
 Light of the lonely pilgrim’s heart
 Preces and Responses

Published by Royal School of Church Music 

 And they shall protect thee
 Preces and Responses (upper voices)
 I give to you a new commandment
 The Lord at first did Adam make
 Mass of St.Cedd
 Kilcreggan Mass (2021)
 For the gifts of life and love

References

1965 births
Living people
People from Renfrewshire
Alumni of the Royal Conservatoire of Scotland
Alumni of the Royal Academy of Music
Cathedral organists
Countertenors
Scottish choral conductors
British male conductors (music)
Scottish composers
Scottish organists
British male organists
20th-century Scottish male singers
21st-century British conductors (music)
21st-century organists
21st-century British male musicians
Male classical organists